Portsmouth Public Schools is a school district headquartered in Portsmouth, Virginia. There are 3 Prek centers, 15 elementary schools, 3 middle schools, 3 high schools, and 2 other education centers.

Administration

Superintendent 
The superintendent of Portsmouth Public Schools is Elie Bracy, III. He began as superintendent at the beginning of the 2015-16 school year. Dr. Bracy previously served as the superintendent Weldon City Schools from 2005 to 2015.  He also served as the director of elementary education and assistant superintendent of curriculum at Northampton County Schools, a school administrator in Wayne County Public Schools, and a guidance counselor/teacher in Northampton County.  His brother, Eric is the superintendent for Johnson County School District in North Carolina

School Board 
There are 9 members on the Portsmouth Public School Board

 LaKeesha S. "Klu" Atkinson (Vice-Chairwoman)
 Sarah Duncan Hinds
 Claude C. Parent
 Cardell C. Patillo (Chairman)
 Tamara L. Shewmake 
 Yolanda E. Thomas
 Vernon L. Tillage, Jr.
 Ingrid P. Whitaker
 Costella B. Williams

Schools

High schools 
 Churchland High School
 I. C. Norcom High School
 Manor High School

Middle schools 
 Churchland Middle School
 Cradock Middle School
 William E. Waters Middle School

Elementary schools:
 Brighton Elementary School
 Churchland Academy Elementary School
 Churchland Elementary School
 Churchland Primary & Intermediate School
 Douglass Park Elementary
 Hodges Manor Elementary School
 James Hurst Elementary School
 John Tyler Elementary School
 Lakeview Elementary School
 Park View Elementary School
 Simonsdale Elementary School
 Victory Elementary School
 Westhaven Elementary School

Preschools:
 Churchland Preschool Center
 Emily Spong Preschool Center
 Mt. Hermon Preschool Center
 Olive Branch Preschool Center

References

External links
 Portsmouth Public Schools
School divisions in Virginia
Education in Portsmouth, Virginia